Archips semistructus is a species of moth of the family Tortricidae. It is found in China and Japan.

The wingspan is 16–20 mm for males and 17–25 mm for females.

The larvae feed on Artemisia (including Artemisia princeps), Cryptomeria japonica, Elaeagnus, Fragaria chiloensis, Prunus mume, Prunus serotina, Punica granatum and Rubus species (including Rubus microphyllus).

References

Moths described in 1937
Archips
Moths of Asia
Moths of Japan